The Phryges are the official mascots of Paris 2024 Olympic and Paralympic Games. They are two anthropomorphic Phrygian caps that are a symbol of France.

History

Origins 

The Phrygian cap, a soft, generally red hat, was worn by freed slaves in Phrygia, an ancient Greek kingdom in what is now Turkey.

At the time of the French Revolution, the Phrygian cap was worn as a symbol of freedom.

Naming and unveiling 
On 14 November 2022, Tony Estanguet, president of the organizing committee, revealed that the Paris 2024 mascot was not an animal nor fictional creature but an object, saying that "We chose an ideal rather than an animal. We chose the Phrygian cap because it's a very strong symbol for the French Republic. For French people, it's a very well-known object that is a symbol of freedom," adding that "the fact that the Paralympics mascot has a visible disability also sends a strong message: to promote inclusion."

The new mascots were touted as "sporty, party-loving and so French."

Characteristics 
Each Phryge was given a personality. The Olympic Phryge is "the smart one" with a "methodical mind and alluring charm." The Paralympic Phryge is "a party animal, spontaneous and a bit hotheaded." The Paralympic Phrygian is the first Paralympic mascot since Sondre, the mascot of the 1994 Winter Paralympics, to have a disability as she wears a prosthesis on one of her legs.

Reception 
In France, criticisms have been made about most of the toy replicas of the mascot being "Made in China." Julie Matikhine, director of the Paris 2024 brand, responded that "18 percent of the stuffed toys produced by the company Doudou et Compagnie will be in Brittany," in the hope of "relocating part of the sector."

The Phryges have been likened to a giant "clitoris in trainers". The French newspaper Libération hailed it as a revolutionary departure from the traditional phallic symbol of the Eiffel Tower.

References

External links 
  
  

Olympic mascots
Paralympic mascots
French mascots
Fictional people from Paris
Fictional dolls and dummies
Fictional twins
2024 Summer Olympics
2024 Summer Paralympics
Fictional amputees
Caps
Costume in the French Revolution
Liberty symbols
Fictional fairies and sprites
Fictional musicians